Weasel Mania is a compilation album by the Chicago punk rock band Screeching Weasel. It was released on Fat Wreck Chords in 2005. The album title is an homage to the Ramones album Ramones Mania.

Track listing 
All songs written by Ben Weasel except "I Wanna Be a Homosexual" by Ben Weasel/John Jughead/Dan Vapid, "Hey Suburbia" written by Ben Weasel/Jughead, and "She's Giving Me the Creeps" written by Ben Weasel/Danny Vapid.

 "My Right"
 "Ashtray"
 "Supermarket Fantasy"
 "Hey Suburbia"
 "Cindy's on Methadone"
 "My Brain Hurts"
 "What We Hate"
 "The Science of Myth"
 "She's Giving Me the Creeps"
 "I Wanna Be a Homosexual"
 "Jeannie's Got a Problem with Her Uterus"
 "Joanie Loves Johnny"
 "Peter Brady"
 "Totally"
 "Leather Jacket"
 "Every Night"
 "Planet of the Apes"
 "99"
 "I Wrote Holden Caulfield"
 "Phasers on Kill"
 "You Blister My Paint"
 "Cool Kids"
 "The First Day of Summer"
 "Racist Society"
 "Dummy Up"
 "Pervert at Large"
 "Speed of Mutation"
 "My Own World"
 "Video"
 "Sidewalk Warrior"
 "Static"
 "Bottom of the 9th"
 "Gotta Girlfriend"
 "You're the Enemy"

Tracks 1-4 from Boogadaboogadaboogada!
Tracks 5-8 from My Brain Hurts
Tracks 9-10 from Kill the Musicians
Tracks 11-12 from Wiggle
Tracks 13-16 from Anthem for a New Tomorrow	
Tracks 17-19 from How to Make Enemies and Irritate People
Tracks 20-23 from Bark Like a Dog
Track 24 from Major Label Debut
Tracks 25-27 from Television City Dream
Track 28 from Return of the Read Menace
Track 29 from Four on the Floor
Tracks 30-31 from Emo
Tracks 32-34 from Teen Punks in Heat

Personnel
Ben Weasel - lead vocals, guitar on tracks 1-4, 13-23, and 29-31
Jughead - guitar
Warren Ozzfish - bass on tracks 1-4
Steve Cheese - drums on tracks 1-4
Dan Vapid- guitar on tracks 5-12, bass on tracks 13-16 and 20-23
Dave Naked- bass on tracks 5-10
Dan Panic - drums on tracks 5-23
Johnny Personality- bass on tracks 11-12
Fat Mike- backing vocals on track 13
Mike Dirnt- bass on tracks 17-19
Teakettle Jones - keyboards on track 22
Zac Damon- guitar on tracks 24-27
Mass Giorgini- bass on tracks 24-34
Dan Lumley- drums on tracks 24-34
Phillip Hill- guitar on tracks 32-34

References

2005 compilation albums
Screeching Weasel compilation albums
Fat Wreck Chords compilation albums